One American Place is a skyscraper in Downtown Baton Rouge, Louisiana. Its exterior surface is clad entirely in mirrored glass.
Completed in 1974, with 24 floors, it stands 308 feet tall. It is currently the second-tallest building in Downtown Baton Rouge.

See also
List of tallest buildings in Baton Rouge

References

External links
 Latter & Blum Commercial Property Information
 

Buildings and structures in Baton Rouge, Louisiana
Skyscrapers in Louisiana
Skyscraper office buildings in Louisiana
Office buildings completed in 1974